The Men's 56 kg competition at the 2017 World Weightlifting Championships was held on 29 November 2017.

Schedule

Medalists

Records

Results

References

Men's 56 kg